Events from the year 1810 in Ireland.

Events
3 July – Royal Belfast Academical Institution foundation stone laid.

Births
3 January – Antoine Thomson d'Abbadie, geographer (died 1897).
10 March – Samuel Ferguson, poet, barrister, antiquarian, artist and public servant (died 1886).
3 June – Robert Mallet, geologist, civil engineer and inventor (died 1881).
3 September – Paul Kane, painter in Canada (died 1871).
27 September – Michael O'Connor, first Catholic Bishop of Pittsburgh, Pennsylvania, first Catholic Bishop of Erie, Jesuit (died 1872).
Full date unknown
Elliot Warburton, travel writer and novelist (died 1852).

Deaths
17 January – James Gordon, merchant, soldier, and politician in America (born 1739).
18 February – Charles FitzGerald, 1st Baron Lecale, politician (born 1756).
24 March – Mary Tighe, poet (born 1772).

References

 
Years of the 19th century in Ireland
1810s in Ireland
Ireland
 Ireland